Vyacheslav Vasilyevich Tikhonov (8 February 1928 – 4 December 2009) was a Soviet and Russian actor whose best known role was as Soviet spy, Stierlitz in the television series Seventeen Moments of Spring. He was a recipient of numerous state awards, including the titles of People's Artist of the USSR (1974) and Hero of Socialist Labour (1982).

Biography 
Tikhonov was born in Pavlovsky Posad near Moscow. His mother was a kindergarten teacher and his father an engineer in the local textile factory. Vyacheslav dreamed of acting but his parents envisioned a different career, and during the war he worked in a munitions factory. After employment as a metal worker, he began [training for an] acting career in 1945. by entering, not without difficulty, the Actors’ Faculty of VGIK. After graduating VGIK with honours in 1950, he began his acting career on stage of Theatre Studio of Film Actor, where he worked for six years.

In 1948, he married Nonna Mordyukova, a popular actress at the time. The couple had one son, Vladimir, also an actor, who died in 1990. The marriage was dissolved in 1963. Later, Tikhonov married a second time to Tamara Ivanovna Tikhonova and had one child with her, Anna Tikhonova, also an actor, in 1969.

He died on 4 December 2009 in Moscow, Russia. Russian President Dmitry Medvedev expressed his condolences to Tikhonov's family.

Career 
Tikhonov made his film debut in 1948. For the next few years, he appeared in relatively low-profile films and at the Film Actors' Studio Theatre in Smolensk. 

Tikhonov became more well known with the release of the rural family drama Delo bylo v Penkove (It Happened in Penkovo, 1958), which was followed by several wartime dramas: Maiskie Zvyozdy (May Stars, 1959), set in Prague, and Na Semi Vetrakh (On the Seven Winds, 1962), on the Western front. In Yevgeny Tashkov's Zhazhda (Thirst, 1959), based on real events, Tikhonov, in the first of his spy roles, portrays a scout in an operation to free an Odessa water plant from the Nazis.

In Dve Zhizni (Two Lives, 1961) Tikhonov plays the less fortunate of two men who unwittingly meet in France, 40-odd years after fighting on opposite sides of the 1917 Revolution. Rostotsky's Dozhivyom do Ponedelnika (We'll Live Till Monday 1968), in which a history teacher plans to defend a student at a disciplinary meeting, earned Tikhonov a state prize. In 1979 Rostotsky made a documentary about his friend, called Profession: film actor."

Tikhonov also played Prince Andrei Bolkonski in the Oscar-winning adaptation of Leo Tolstoy's War and Peace (1968) by Sergei Bondarchuk (who played Bezukhov). But Tikhonov reportedly got the role only at the suggestion of the Minister of Culture when Innokenty Smoktunovsky opted for Kozintsev's Hamlet and Oleg Strizhenov was also unavailable.

In 1973, Tikhonov starred in the role for which he is most known for in the former Soviet republics, when director Tatiana Lioznova chose him over Smoktunovsky to star in an adaptation of Yulian Semyonov's novel Seventeen Moments of Spring as Standartenführer Stierlitz. The 17 moments are 17 days in the spring of 1945 just before the defeat of Nazi Germany in World War II and centers around attempts by some of the Soviet Union's men in Germany to thwart secret peace talks between the Nazis and the U.S. and Britain. The film enjoyed enormous popularity among Russian viewers of several generations. Prior to that, however, it had faced the risk of remaining unknown: Mikhail Suslov had opposed the film to go on general release. He had claimed that the film was not showing the feat of the Soviet people in the war. Fortunately, the decision to release the would-be classic film was supported by KGB Chairman Yuri Andropov. Although several of Semyonov's Stierlitz novels were adapted for the screen, Tikhonov did not return, perhaps feeling that the original series was definitive. The role won him the title People's Artist of the USSR, one of a number of awards.

In 1976, Tikhonov rejoined Bondarchuk in an adaptation of Mikhail Sholokhov's They Fought for Their Country. It suited Tikhonov by concentrating on character rather than histrionics and won him another state prize in the year that he finally joined the Communist Party. 1977 saw a change of pace with Rostotsky's Oscar-nominated Beliy Bim Chernoe Ukho (White Bim the Black Ear), in which Tikhonov played a middle-aged writer who is "adopted" by a non-pedigree setter puppy.

Though he was often typecast as militiamen or spies, there were good roles among them, such as the KGB general in the cold-war thriller TASS upolnomochen zayavit (Tass is authorised to announce, 1984), another television series based on a Semyonov novel. In later years he was able to display a wider range, including the bishop in Besy, a film version of Dostoyevsky's The Devils (1992) and Charlemagne, in the Ubit Drakona, (To Kill a Dragon, 1998) after Evgeny Shvarts's wartime satire. Shvarts was inspired by Hans Christian Andersen, and Tikhonov appeared in Eldar Ryazanov's fantasy-biography of the Danish fabulist, Andersen: Life Without Love (2006), playing God. On 8 February 2003, Russian President Vladimir Putin awarded the Order of Merit for the Fatherland, third degree, to Tikhonov.

Tikhonov appeared in Nikita Mikhalkov's Oscar-winning Burnt By the Sun (1994) and also appeared in the 2010 sequel, which finished shooting before his death.

Filmography

Film

Television

Legacy
 The name of Vyacheslav Tikhonov is given to the marine vessel of geophysical exploration of the shipping company Sovcomflot (launched in August 2011, the flag was raised on 16 September 2011).
 In May 2013, a monument by sculptor Alexey Blagovestnov was installed on the actor's grave. The monument reflects the versatility of Tikhonov's talent. The bronze figure is located in front of the relief on the gospel story Adoration of the Magi, which depicts more than 30 biblical characters.
 A Commemorative plaque is installed on the building of Lyceum No. 2 in Pavlovsky Posad (the former school No. 1, where the actor studied), now bearing his name.
 Since 2017, the Vyacheslav Tikhonov International Film Festival, called "17 Moments", has been held. The initiator of the festival was the actor's daughter Anna.
 On 25 August 2018, the V. Tikhonov House-museum was opened in Pavlovsky Posad in the house where the actor was born and grew up.
 2019 — Volodarsky Street in Pavlovsky Posad was renamed Tikhonov Street.
 On 20 May 2022, a monument to Vyacheslav Tikhonov was unveiled in Pavlovsky Posad. The monument made of bronze and granite is installed at the intersection of Herzen and Kirov streets.

References

External links 

 
 Actor Vyacheslav Tikhonov, the Legendary Stierlitz (Biography)

1928 births
2009 deaths
People from Pavlovo-Posadsky District
Communist Party of the Soviet Union members
Russian male film actors
Russian male television actors
Soviet male film actors
Soviet male television actors
Heroes of Socialist Labour
Lenin Prize winners
People's Artists of the USSR
Recipients of the USSR State Prize
Burials at Novodevichy Cemetery